The Warwick River is a river of the Tasman Region of New Zealand's South Island. It flows southwest to reach the Maruia River 10 kilometres north of Maruia. State Highway 65 follows the course of the Warwick River for some of its length.

See also
List of rivers of New Zealand

References

Rivers of the Tasman District
Rivers of New Zealand